Fahd bin Abdullah Al Saud (born 1941) is the former deputy defence minister of Saudi Arabia and a member of the House of Saud.

Early life and education
Prince Fahd is the son of Abdullah bin Mohammad and Noura bint Saud (died late July 2013), King Saud's daughter. His father was the older maternal half brother of the Sudairi Seven (only son of Hassa bint Ahmed Al Sudairi through her marriage to Mohammad bin Abdul Rahman, half-brother of King Abdulaziz). Prince Fahd has four brothers and two sisters, and he has half siblings from his father's other marriages.

He is a graduate of the US Naval Staff and Command College. He holds a master's degree in military sciences. He also attended advanced naval programs in the US, the UK and Pakistan. In addition, he participated in programs on command and staff at the Military College in the US.

Career

Fahd bin Abdullah was a military officer. He had business activities while serving in these posts. He became the commander of the marine forces in Royal Saudi Navy in April 2002. He also served at the ships of King Abdulaziz and the floating units of the marine base. In addition, he assumed the following posts: the chief of the operations authority of the Naval Forces, director at the office of the minister of defense and aviation and inspector general and then deputy commander of the naval forces. He retired from navy at the rank of lieutenant general. Then he was made assistant to the minister of defense and aviation as well as the chairman of the economic offset committee at the ministry of defense and aviation.

On 20 April 2013, he was appointed deputy defence minister at the rank of minister, replacing Khalid bin Sultan in the post. However, Prince Fahd's tenure was very brief and on 7 August 2013 he was replaced by Salman bin Sultan, son of late Prince Sultan.

Prince Fahd is the chairman of Fama Group Holding based in Riyadh.

Arrest

On 4 November 2017, Fahd bin Abdullah bin Mohammed Al Saud was arrested in Saudi Arabia in a corruption crackdown conducted by a newly founded royal anti-corruption committee.

Personal life
Prince Fahd is married to Fahda bint Bandar bin Mohammed bin Abdul Rahman Al Saud. They have eight children. His son, Abdulaziz, is married to Princess Sara, daughter of the former deputy minister of defense Khalid bin Sultan Al Saud.

Prince Fahd is known for his love of the desert and Arabian horses.

Ancestry

References

External links

Fahd
Fahd
Fahd
1941 births
Fahd
Lieutenant generals
Living people
Fahd
United States Naval Academy alumni